Digital terrestrial television in Portugal (or TDT) started on 29 April 2009 with currently (as of December 2016) 7 free-to-air (FTA) channels. In the Azores and Madeira Islands, the respective regional channels (RTP Açores or RTP Madeira) are also available. In June 2010 TDT coverage reached 83% of the population and was expected to reach 100% by the end of 2010. The analog switch-off occurred on 26 April 2012. The already four existing analog FTA channels simulcasted in DVB-T, MPEG-4/H.264 (digital), and PAL (analog).

The TDT process was broken into two different licenses: one for the management of the FTA network and frequencies, and one for the management and distribution of pay TV channels and content. Both licenses were won by Portugal Telecom (PT). PT also acquired the transmitter network of Televisão Independente (TVI), thus becoming the sole broadcaster of analog television signals. ANACOM's objective was to have 5 TDT FTA channels (including a new 5th FTA channel) and a paid TV offer of around 40 channels. The plan for a paid TV offer was abandoned when PT announced that they were returning the paid TV license to ANACOM, which returned the  million paid by PT for the license.

The creation of the 5th TV channel has been criticized by the main private broadcasters, TVI and Sociedade Independente de Comunicação (SIC). They argued that the television advertising market is already saturated and a new broadcaster would be detrimental to the existing channels.

Channels

References

 

Television in Portugal
Portugal
2009 establishments in Portugal